Last Call is a Chilean-American psychological thriller film. It was released in Chile on 3 January 1999, and in the United States on 8 August 1999 at the Hollywood Film Festival.

As it is a collaboration between both countries, and a Chilean production aimed at the American market, the dialogue is in English. It features American and Chilean actors such as Bastián Bodenhöfer, Elizabeth Berkley, Peter Coyote, and Lorene Prieto.

Plot
In a central apartment building in Santiago, three foreigners wait impatiently for a call to carry out an illegal operation in the desert. In her apartment, Helena, a lonely American woman, waits for her lover. Upstairs, Nico settles in his brother's apartment. As time goes by, tension increases, intertwining these characters' lives in a sordid and oppressive environment.

Cast
 Peter Coyote as Xuave
 Eric Michael Cole as Nico
 Lorene Prieto as Cote
 Elizabeth Rossa as Connie
 Bastián Bodenhöfer as Miguel
 Elizabeth Berkley as Helena
 Garret Dillahunt as Curtis
  as Lucho
 Anita Reeves as Mother
 David Olguiser as Son
 Teresa Berríos as Grandmother
  as Gangster
 Elizabeth Gomez Aguilera (Ely Sanders) as the cashier

Release dates
 3 January 1999 – Chile
 8 August 1999 – United States (Hollywood Film Festival)
 5 June 2007 – DVD release in Canada and United States

References

External links
 
 

1990s psychological thriller films
1999 films
American psychological thriller films
Chilean thriller films
1990s English-language films
1990s American films